The Central Ground was a football stadium in Northwich, Cheshire, which was the home ground of Witton Albion Football Club between 1910 and 1 May 1989. A Sainsbury's supermarket now occupies the site.

History
Witton Albion's first ground was adjacent to the Parish Church Vicarage. In 1897 and 1910, the club moved to Magdala Place. By 1910, the club moved to a new site near the Victoria Saw Mills on Witton Street. Over the next ten years, the club leased the land for £15 per year, and in July 1920, the club purchased the land outright for £750, and was renamed as the Central Ground.
 
In the 1960s, a small grandstand was constructed at the southern perimeter of the ground. The northern perimeter included a terrace area that ran the length of the pitch. The goal ends featured grass embankments with hooped metal railings.

Witton Albion sold the Central Ground to J Sainsbury PLC in 1989, and the football club moved to Wincham Park, a new ground in nearby Wincham later that year. The final match at the Central Ground was a 1–1 draw against Frickley Athletic on 1 May 1989. A new Sainsbury's store was erected on the site along with a new link road, Venables Road.

References

Witton Albion F.C.
Defunct football venues in England
Demolished buildings and structures in England
Defunct sports venues in Cheshire
Sports venues demolished in 1989
Northwich
Demolished sports venues in the United Kingdom